John Edward Taylor (1921 – 20 September 2008) was an American military archivist at the National Archives and Records Administration for 63 years.

Life and career

Taylor was born in Sparkman, Arkansas and graduated from the University of Arkansas in 1945. He was frequently acknowledged by authors for his assistance, and the National Archives named its collection of intelligence and espionage books in his honor. Taylor died of congestive heart failure at his home in Chevy Chase, Maryland.

References

External links
National Archives Announces Death of Legendary Archivist John Taylor via National Archives

1921 births
2008 deaths
American archivists
People from Dallas County, Arkansas
People from Chevy Chase, Maryland
People from Montgomery County, Maryland
University of Arkansas alumni